Defending champion Novak Djokovic defeated Rafael Nadal in the final, 5–7, 6–4, 6–2, 6–7(5–7), 7–5 to win the men's singles tennis title at the 2012 Australian Open. It was his third Australian Open title and fifth major title overall. The final lasted 5 hours and 53 minutes, which is the longest match in duration in Australian Open history and the longest major singles final by duration in the Open Era. It is often considered to be among the greatest matches in tennis history, and marked Nadal's third consecutive major final loss to Djokovic, with Nadal becoming the first man to lose three consecutive major finals in the Open Era.

This edition of the tournament saw the top four seeds advance to the semifinals. This is also the last Grand Slam in which all members of the Big Four made it to the semifinals.

This was the last major appearance for former world No. 3 Ivan Ljubičić. It was also the last Australian Open for former world No. 1's Andy Roddick & Juan Carlos Ferrero, and former world No. 3 David Nalbandian.

Seeds

Qualifying

Wildcards

Draw

Finals

Top half

Section 1

Section 2

Section 3

Section 4

Bottom half

Section 5

Section 6

Section 7

Section 8

Notes

References
General

Specific

External links
 2012 Australian Open – Men's draws and results at the International Tennis Federation

Men's Singles
2012